Svärdsjö is a locality situated in Falun Municipality, Dalarna County, Sweden with 1,251 inhabitants in 2010.

References 

Populated places in Dalarna County
Populated places in Falun Municipality